Pratt Contractors Ltd v Palmerston North City Council [1995] 1 NZLR 469  is a cited case in New Zealand regarding contract formation involving tenders.

Background
The Palmerston North City Council put out for tender the construction of a flyover. The tender documents set out detailed criteria and plans for the construction of the flyover, and was to be awarded to the lowest tenderer.

However, a rival contractor submitted a tender for the construction of a redesigned flyover, and the council subsequently accepted that tender, without giving the other tenderers the opportunity to submit a tender for the new design.

After discovering all this, Pratt Contractors sued the council for damages.

Held
The court held that the city council tender was a legally binding obligation, and as a result the city council should have given Pratt Contractors the opportunity to revise and resubmit their tender. The court awarded damages of $17,822 for reimbursement of the costs in preparing the tender. On top of this, damages for $200,000 for loss of profit was also awarded.

Footnote: The judge noted that the council could have alternatively accepted none of the tenders instead.

References

High Court of New Zealand cases
New Zealand contract case law
1994 in case law
1994 in New Zealand law
Palmerston North